Akko brevis, the dark-tail specter-goby, is a species of gobies native to the eastern central Pacific from El Salvador to Panama. It is found in black muddy bottoms of estuaries and mangroves.

Short description 
Distinguished by the following characteristics: very small eyes; light pink body color with darker red areas composed of blood capillaries close to surface; elongate body; first dorsal with VII spines; upper and lower jaws with enlarged, widely spaced teeth that overlap the lips of both jaws; greatly reduced head pores, occasionally absent (Ref. 92840).

References

brevis
Fish described in 1864
Taxa named by Albert Günther